Hudavendigar may refer to:

 Sultan Murad I
 Hüdavendigâr Eyalet
Hüdavendigar, Karacabey, a village in the Karacabey district of Bursa Province
 Hüdavendigâr Vilayet, successor entity of the above
 the poetic name of Bursa, a Turkish city